Nancy Lay-McCormick (born April 27, 1962) is a St. Louis Soccer Hall of Fame inductee (2016) and the first woman, along with Sandra Hunt, to referee in the MLS in 1998. She was an ambidextrous soccer star who played forward at the University of Central Florida from 1981 to 1982. She was a leading goal scorer and an All-American. She also played for Senior League teams J.B. Marine, Trammell Crow, TBA, and Busch, winning state, regional, and national championships.

Progression into sports 
After completing high school, Lay-McCormick moved on to college where she started out at the University of Missouri for her freshman year. The University of Central Florida then offered Nancy a scholarship for soccer, and despite being able to be a walk-on basketball player for Mizzou, Lay-McCormick decided to take the scholarship and move to Florida. While playing for the UCF Knights from 1981 to 1982, Lay-McCormick played in two National Finals including the AIWA and the first NCAA Women's Soccer Finals, and was an All-American. Lay-McCormick received her bachelor’s degree in Health and Physical Education.

Career 
In 1985 Lay-McCormick started her career in refereeing. After over a thousand games as the senior referee Lay-McCormick became the first woman to referee in the MLS (Dallas VS New York in Dallas, Texas on August 29, 1998), developed the Women Referee Academy for US Soccer (which developed officials for women at the National Veteran’s Cup), and developed the Florida State Referee Teaching Association. She also coached for Villa Duchesne, Pacific High School, Clearwater High School, as well as boys and girls in Olympic development in Georgia and Virginia.

References 

General references
Curtis, Russell.  "Florida Teacher Makes Soccer History", American Teacher, November 1998. Retrieved on July 15, 2019.
Borzilleri, Meri-Jo. "Soccer ref's debut a milestone", The Herald, August 26, 1998. Retrieved on July 15, 2019.
Barnes, Craig. "Refs", Sun-Sentinel, August 25, 1998. Retrieved on July 15, 2019.

1962 births
American women's soccer players
American soccer referees
Living people
Soccer players from Missouri
UCF Knights women's soccer players
Women's association football forwards
American women referees and umpires